Nadia Bolz-Weber (born April 22, 1969) is an author, Lutheran minister and public theologian. She served as the founding pastor of House for All Sinners and Saints, a congregation of the Evangelical Lutheran Church in America in Denver, Colorado, until July 8, 2018. As of this date, she is also a three-time New York Times bestselling memoirist.

Bolz-Weber is known for her unusual approach to reaching others through her church. She has produced work in the church that scholar and writer Diana Butler Bass considers part of "a new Reformation".

Biography 
Bolz-Weber grew up in Colorado Springs in a fundamentalist Christian family.

Bolz-Weber began to acquire tattoos in 1986 at age 17. Those present on her arms mark the liturgical year and the story of the Gospel. She attended Pepperdine University briefly before dropping out and then moving to Denver. She says that she became an alcoholic and drug abuser and often felt like one of "society's outsiders".

By 1991, Bolz-Weber became sober and, as of 2020, has remained so for 28 years. Prior to her ordination, she was a stand-up comedian and worked in the restaurant industry.

Bolz-Weber felt called to service in 2004 when she was asked to eulogize a friend who had committed suicide. In 2008, Bolz-Weber was ordained as a pastor. She started her own church, the House for All Sinners and Saints, the name of which is often shortened to just 'House.' One third of her church is part of the LGBT community, and she also has a "Minister of Fabulousness", Stuart, who is a drag queen. Her church is also very welcoming to people with drug addiction, depression, and even those who are not believers of her faith. Bolz-Weber spends nearly twenty hours each week writing her weekly ten-minute sermon.

Bolz-Weber speaks at conferences across the world. She has given talks about how faith and feminism co-exist. As a feminist, in 2018 she called for women to send her their purity rings, to be melted down into a sculpture of a vagina which she regarded as representing the healing of the psychic damage induced by the 1990s purity movement. At the Makers conference on Valentine's Day, February 14, 2019, Bolz-Weber gave the sculpture to American feminist and political activist Gloria Steinem.

On August 20, 2021, Bolz-Weber was called by the ELCA’s Rocky Mountain Synod and installed as that denomination's first Pastor of Public Witness, in a ceremony where the synod's bishop, Jim Gonia, gave the installation address.

Books 
Salvation on the Small Screen?: 24 Hours of Christian Television. New York : Seabury Books, 2008. , 
Pastrix: The Cranky, Beautiful Faith of A Sinner and Saint. New York ; Boston ; Nashville : Jericho Books, 2014. , 
Accidental Saints: Finding God in All the Wrong People. Convergent, 2016. , 
Shameless: A Sexual Reformation. Convergent Books, January 2019. , .

Personal life
As of 2013, Bolz-Weber had been married to Matthew Weber since 1996, and had two children.

Further reading

References

External links

 Seeing the Underside and Seeing God: Tattoos, Tradition, and Grace, Nadia Bolz Weber — On Being, September 5, 2013
 
 Nadia Bolz-Weber  Video produced by Makers: Women Who Make America

Living people
1969 births
People from Colorado Springs, Colorado
People from Denver
American Christian writers
American feminist writers
21st-century American Lutheran clergy
American stand-up comedians
American women comedians
American women's rights activists
Evangelical Lutheran Church in America Christians
Christian feminist theologians
LGBT and Lutheranism
American LGBT rights activists
Lutheran writers
Women Lutheran clergy
Women religious writers
Christian bloggers
American women non-fiction writers
21st-century American comedians
American women bloggers
American bloggers
Public theologians
21st-century American women
20th-century American Lutheran clergy
Women civil rights activists
21st-century American women writers
Writers from Colorado
Activists from Colorado
Comedians from Colorado